Conrad Rupsch or Konrad Rupff (c. 1475-1530, (fl. 1520s) was a German composer. He was kapellmeister to Frederick the Wise and later collaborated with Johann Walter and Martin Luther on the music for the Deutsche Messe.

External links

References

German classical composers
Renaissance composers
1470s births
1530s deaths
German male classical composers